The Lithuanian Land Forces Band also informally known as the Iron Wolf Military Band, is a Lithuanian military band that serves as the official band of the Lithuanian Land Forces. It is officially attached to the Mechanised Infantry Brigade Iron Wolf, specifically the Grand Duchess Birutė Mechanized Uhlan Battalion in Alytus. It was established in the half of 1994. It is currently composed of 36 members of the land forces. It has taken part in many international festivals since it came into existence around the time of the Fall of the Soviet Union. Among these festivals are the Hamina Tattoo in 2008. It has also taken part in many municipal and regional events. Notable commanders also include General Justinas Jonušas (who later led the Lithuanian Armed Forces Headquarters Band) and Captain Viktoras Ščetilnikovas, who served the band until his death in 2019.

See also
Lithuanian Air Force Band
National Defence Volunteer Force Big Band

References

External links
Lithuanian Land Forces Band / LK SP Orkestras
The Military "Iron Wolf" band (Lithuania)

Lithuanian military bands
Lithuanian musical groups
Musical groups established in 1991
1991 establishments in Lithuania